"Teen Beat" is a 1959 instrumental number by Sandy Nelson. Released on Original Sound Records, it rose to number 4 on the Billboard Hot 100 chart in 1959. It sold over one million copies, and was awarded a gold disc. In addition, the song made #17 on the R&B Singles Chart and #9 on the UK Singles Chart. The song also made #36 on the Billboard Year-End Hot 100 singles of 1959. The guitar was played on the recording by co-writer Richard Podolor, later a songwriter and record producer, and the piano was by Bruce Johnston.

A re-recorded version, released as a single in 1964 and titled "Teen Beat '65", also made the Billboard and Cashbox charts.

References

1959 singles
1950s instrumentals
Sandy Nelson songs
1959 songs